Secunderabad Cantonment Assembly constituency is a constituency of Telangana Legislative Assembly, India. It is one of 15 constituencies in the capital city of Hyderabad.It is part of Malkajgiri Lok Sabha constituency.
 
In 2014, G. Sayanna from Telugu Desam Party was elected as MLA by defeating nearest rival with 2.60% votes margin.

The incumbent MLA Shri G Sayanna died on February 19, 2023.

Extent of the constituency
The Assembly Constituency presently comprises the following neighbourhoods:

Members of Legislative Assembly

Election results

2018

2014

See also
 List of constituencies of Telangana Legislative Assembly

References

Assembly constituencies of Telangana